Jean-Claude Leroy (born 3 June 1952 in Wavrans-sur-l'Aa) was a member of the National Assembly of France. He represented the Pas-de-Calais department,  and is a member of the Socialist Party, part of the Socialiste, radical, citoyen et divers gauche group.

He has been president of the Departmental Council of Pas-de-Calais since 2017.

References

1952 births
Living people
People from Pas-de-Calais
Politicians from Hauts-de-France
Socialist Party (France) politicians
Deputies of the 11th National Assembly of the French Fifth Republic
Deputies of the 12th National Assembly of the French Fifth Republic
Deputies of the 13th National Assembly of the French Fifth Republic
French Senators of the Fifth Republic
Senators of Pas-de-Calais
Members of Parliament for Pas-de-Calais
Presidents of French departments